Bulbophyllum auricomum is a species of orchid in the genus Bulbophyllum. It is endemic to the low-elevation forests of Southeast Asia, specifically Burma/Myanmar, Thailand, and the Indonesian islands of Sumatra and Java. Its fragrant flowers open in late fall to early winter.

References
The Bulbophyllum-Checklist
The Internet Orchid Species Photo Encyclopedia

External links 

auricomum
Plants described in 1830